The Archives Nationales du Sénégal (in English: National Archives of Senegal) is headquartered in Dakar, in the "Central Park" building on Avenue Malick Sy. It was first called "Archives Nationales" in 1962, but the collection existed since 1913 as the archives of the colonial French West Africa administration. It moved from Saint-Louis to Dakar after 1958.

Archivists have included:
 Claude Faure (1911-1920)
 Prosper Alquier (1921-1922)
 Médoune Mbaye (1922-1936)
 André Villard (1936-1942)
  (1945-1948)
 Jacques Charpy (1951-1958)
 Jean-François Maurel (1958-1959)
 Saliou Mbaye (1976-2005)
 Babacar Ndiaye, circa 2010-2011? 
 Fatoumata Cissé Diarra, circa 2013?-present

See also
 Unesco Memory of the World Register – Africa
 Bibliothèque des Archives nationales du Sénégal
 History of Senegal

References

This article incorporates information from the French Wikipedia.

Bibliography
  (Includes information about the National Archives of Senegal)
   (Includes information about the National Archives of Senegal)

External links 
 Official site (in French)
 WorldCat. Archives nationales (Senegal)
 

Government agencies established in 1913
Senegal
Senegal
Archives in Senegal
Government of Senegal
History of Senegal
1913 establishments in the French colonial empire
Dakar